Michel Vinaver (born Michel Grinberg; 13 January 1927 – 1 May 2022) was a French writer and dramatist. He was born in Paris to parents who had emigrated from Russia. He was the manager of Gillette. He is the father of actress Anouk Grinberg. In 2006 he was awarded the Grand prix du théâtre de l'Académie française.

Works
 l'Objecteur (c. 1952; awarded the 1952 Fénéon Prize)
 Les Coréens (1956)
 Iphigénie Hotel (1963)
 A la renverse (1980)
 Jules César - translation from Shakespeare (1990) 
 11 septembre 2001/11 September 2001 (2001)

References

 

1927 births
2022 deaths
20th-century French dramatists and playwrights
French people of Russian descent
Writers from Paris
Prix Fénéon winners
French male dramatists and playwrights
20th-century French male writers
Wesleyan University alumni
Officiers of the Légion d'honneur
21st-century French dramatists and playwrights
21st-century French male writers